Ilona Keserü (born Ilona Keserü, 29 November 1933) is a  Hungarian painter, professor emerita, Kossuth Prize winner.

Life and career 

Ilona Keserü was born in Pécs, Hungary. She studied at the Free School of Art (Pécs) between 1946 and 1950, then at the High School of Fine and Applied Art (Budapest) between 1950 and 1952. She was accepted to the Academy of Fine Art in 1952, where, after completing the painting and mural courses, she graduated in 1958. During the first three years at the College her professor had been László Bencze, followed by István Szőnyi. However, she considers Ferenc Martyn as her real master, who had been overseeing her professional development from as early as 1945.

From 1960 she worked for the Belles-lettres and the Ferenc Móra Publishing Houses as an illustrator. In 1962 she received a scholarship from the Italian government and followed the courses of the Accademia di Belle Arti in Rome for a year. There she had her first show at the Galleria Bars in 1963.
She then returned to Hungary and besides painting, she dedicated herself to designing sets and costumes for performances at the National Theatre, the Katona József Theatre, the Opera House, and the Ódry Stage in Budapest, the Gergely Csíky Theatre in Kaposvár, the Katona József Theatre in Kecskemét and the Hungarian Theatre in Targu Mures (Romania).

Ilona Keserü showed her first abstract paintings at the Jókai Klub in Budapest in 1964, then regularly thereafter in Budapest and various Hungarian cities. In 1972 she exhibited in Czechoslovakia, then, in the summer of 1974 she painted a mural in Vence (France). She also worked on a mural for the new Sports Palace in Budapest in 1979. From 1963 onwards she has taken part in numerous group-shows throughout the world. For example, at the Olympiade des Arts in Seoul, South Korea in 1988, at the Das Offene Bild in Münster, Germany in 1992.

Ilona Keserü taught drawing and painting at the University of Pécs from 1983 to 2003 (from 1991 as professor). From 2003 to 2008, as professor emerita, she organized short painting courses and exhibitions for Doctorate students entitled Színerő (Colour Force), a platform for creating and presenting works of large scale at the unused great halls of the Zsolnay Factory in Pécs. She is one of the founders of the Master School of Fine Arts in Pécs. She also gave lectures at universities abroad as a guest professor: at the École des Beaux Arts (Cergy-Pontoise, France) in 1985, and at the University of Hertfordshire (UK) in 1998. Throughout her life, Keserü took part in study trips to various countries from Poland to the US.

Ilona Keserü received the Mihály Munkácsy Prize in 1984, became an Artist of Merit in 1989, and was awarded the Cross Order of Merit of the Hungarian Republic in 1996. She became a member of the Széchenyi Academy of Letters and Arts in 1993. In 2000 she was awarded the Kossuth Prize and in 2014 the Artist of the Nation Award.

Ilona Keserü lives and works in Budapest and Pécs, Hungary.

Solo exhibitions (selection) 
 1963 Galleria Bars, Rome, Italy
 1964 Jókai Klub, Budapest, Hungary
 1967 BME Kollégiumi Klub, Budapest, Hungary
 1969 Fényes Adolf Room, Budapest, Hungary (with István Bencsik and János Major)
 1973 Csepel Gallery, Csepel, Budapest, Hungary
 1978 István Csók Picture Gallery, Székesfehérvár, Hungary (retrospective)
 1983 Kunsthalle (Műcsarnok), Budapest, Hungary (retrospective)
 1989 Galerie Eremitage, Berlin, Germany
 1999 Szinyei Salon, Budapest, Hungary
 2001 Picture Gallery of the City Art Museum, Győr, Hungary
 2002 Accademia d’Ungheria, Rome, Italy
 2002 Museum Gallery, Pécs, Hungary
 2002 Blitz Modern Gallery, MEO Contemporary Art Collection, Budapest, Hungary
 2004 MEO, Budapest, Hungary (retrospective)
 2004 Ludwig Museum - Museum of Contemporary Art, Budapest, Hungary (retrospective)
 2004 Hungarian Cultural Centre, London, UK
 2005, 2006 AL Gallery, Budapest, Hungary
 2008 MODEM, Debrecen, Hungary
 2011 Danubiana Meulensteen Art Museum, Bratislava, Slovakia
 2012 Cangiante - Colour Shifting, Kieselbach Gallery and Auction House, Budapest, Hungary
 2014 The Scene of Time - Cangiante, Vaszary Villa, Balatonfüred, Hungary

Group exhibitions (selection) 
 1950 Youth Exhibition of Fine and Applied Arts, National Salon, Budapest, Hungary
 1966 Stúdió 66, Ernst Museum, Budapest, Hungary
 1968 Danuvius 1968, Dom Umenia, Bratislava, Czechoslovakia
 1968 Iparterv, Iparterv Design Office, Budapest, Hungary
 1969 Ungarische Künstler, Oldenburg
 1975 2nd Trienniale India, Lalit Kala Akademi, New Delhi, India
 1976 Pittura Ungherese del XX. Secolo, Palazzo Reale, Milano, Italy
 1976 International Biennial of Graphic Design, Florence, Italy
 1980 XXXIX. Biennale di Venezia, Hungarian Pavilon, Venice, Italy
 1982 Musée Cantini, Marseille, France
 1982 L’art hongrois contemporain, L’Espace Pierre Cardin, Paris, France
 1985 Drei Generationen ungarischer Künstler, Neue Galerie am Landesmuseum Joanneum, Graz, Austria
 1988 Olympiade of Arts, National Museum of Contemporary Art, Seoul, South Korea
 1992 Das offene Bild. Aspekte der Moderne in Europa nach 1945, Westfälisches Landesmuseum, Münster, Germany
 1998 Hungarian Presence, Zaheŧa, Warsaw, Poland
 1999 Aspekten/Positionen, Museum Moderner Kunst Stiftung Ludwig, Vienna, Austria
 1999 Perspective, Kunsthalle, Budapest, Hungary
 2002 Situation Ungarn, Stiftung Brandenburger Tor im Max Liebermann Haus, Berlin, Germany
 2004 Palazzo Pazzi UNIFI, Florence, Italy
 2014 The Use of Cangiante Colour Technique in Ilona Keserü Ilona's New Paintings, Cabinet Exhibition at the Museum of Fine Art, Budapest, Hungary

Works in public collections 
 Suermondt-Ludwig-Museum, Aachen, Germany
 Mondriaanhuis, Amersfoort, Netherlands
 Nationalgalerie, Berlin Germany
 Municipal Picture Gallery, Budapest, Hungary
 Institut Francais, Budapest, Hungary
 Kassák Memorial Museum, Budapest, Hungary
 Hungarian National Gallery, Budapest, Hungary
 Ludwig Museum - Museum of Contemporary Art, Budapest, Hungary
 Museo e Pinacoteca Comunali, Gubbio, Italy
 Municipal Picture Gallery, Győr, Hungary
 Municipal Picture Gallery, Kamien Pomorski, Poland
 Katona József Museum, Kecskemét, Hungary
 Erholungshaus der Bayer A.G.Kunstsammlung, Leverkusen, Germany
 Gallery of Modern Hungarian Art, Janus Pannonius Museum, Pécs, Hungary
 University of Pécs, Pécs, Hungary
 Picture Gallery, Paks, Hungary
 National Museum of Contemporary Art, Seoul, South Korea
 Muzeum Narodowe, Szczecin, Poland
 Ferenczy Museum, Szentendre, Hungary
 King Saint Stephen Museum, Székesfehérvár, Hungary
 Picture Gallery, Szombathely, Hungary
 National Museum of Women in the Arts, Washington, USA
 Fondation Károlyi, Vence, France
 Sculpture Park, Villány, Hungary
 Zentralsparkasse, Vienna, Ausztria
 Uffizi Gallery, Vasari Corridor - Self-Portrait Collection, Florence, Italy
 Danubiana Meulensteen Art Museum, Bratislava, Slovakia

Notes

References 
 Olympiade des Arts, Olympiad of Art - published by the Seoul Olympic Organising Committee (SLOOC), edited by Ante Glibota, Paris Art Centre 1988
 Das Offene Bild - Münster, 1992. 
 Ilona Keserü Ilona Works 1982-2008 - published by MODEM Modern Debreceni Művészeti Közhasznú Társaság, 2009. 
 Ilona Keserü Ilona Works 1959-1982 - edited and published by Ilona Keserü Ilona, 
 Ilona Keserü Ilona Approach Tangle Stream - An investigation of Causes and Effects in Ilona Keserü Ilona's Oeuvre - published by Katalin Néray, director of Ludwig Museum - Museum of Contemporary Art, Budapest, 2004. 
 Women in the Arts - published by the National Museum of Women in the Arts, Fall 2008 (volume 26, no. 3)
 Groupe Iparterv - Le progrés de l'illusion 1968-69 - The third generation of the Hungarian avant-garde - published by András Ecsedi-Derdák, Institut hongrois de Paris, 2010. 
 Studio - International Journal of Modern Art - published by Studio International Publications Ltd., London, edited by Peter Townsend, March 1974 (volume 184, n.o.964) p. 105
 Aktuelle Kunst aus Ungarn, László Fehér - István Haász - Ilona Keserü Ilona - Károly Klimó - published by 2006.

External links 
 Ilona Keserü Ilona's website
 University of Pécs
 Danubiana Meulensteen Art Museum
 Ludwig Museum
 AL Gallery, Budapest
 Uffizi Gallery, Florence
 National Museum of Women in the Arts
 Mondriaanhuis, Amersfoort, Netherlands
 Work no.1. at the Hungarian National Gallery
 Work no.2. at the Hungarian National Gallery
 Artportal (in Hungarian)
 Museum of Fine Art - The Use of Cangiante Colour Technique in Ilona Keserü Ilona's New Paintings (in Hungarian)
 Kieselbach Gallery and Auction House, Budapest
 Approach - Tangle - Stream, An Investigation of Causes and Effects in Ilona Keserü Ilona's Ouvre (excerpts in English) 

1933 births
Living people
20th-century Hungarian women artists
21st-century Hungarian women artists
People from Pécs